Homicide was an Australian television police procedural drama series made by production firm Crawford Productions for the Seven Network. It was the television successor to Crawfords' radio series D24. The "Consummate Homicide cast" includes the four characters that are the best known: Det. Snr. Sgt. David "Mac" MacKay (Leonard Teale), Det. Sgt. Peter Barnes (George Mallaby), Inspector Colin Fox (Alwyn Kurts) and Sen. Det. Jim Patterson (Norman Yemm).

Synopsis
The series dealt with the homicide squad of the Victorian Police force and the various crimes and cases the detectives are called upon to investigate. Many episodes were based directly on real cases, although the characters (including the detectives) were fictional. 510 episodes were produced and aired from 20 October 1964 to January 1977 (12 years and 6 months), making it the longest-running Australian weekly primetime drama in history.

With 510 episodes produced (the last episode is numbered 509, due to the pilot episode being numbered with an 'A' suffix, making a total of 510), for many years it held the record for most episodes produced in an Australian weekly primetime drama. When Blue Heelers ended in 2006, the show equalled this record. However, Homicide ran on-air for longer than Blue Heelers, and had a greater cumulative running time due to five feature-length episodes.

Cast and characters

Scripts 

Homicide scripts explored a number of major social issues, such as:
pack rape (episode 21, "The Violators")
prostitution (episode 23, "The Brand")
loneliness, suicide and mercy killing (episode 31, "An Act Of Love")
the occult (episode 34, "Witch Hunt")
police shooting of criminals (episode 76, "The Snipers")
road safety (episode 123, "No Licence To Kill")
drugs (episode 128, "Freakout")
the plight of pensioners (episode 208, "Everybody Knows Charlie")
pollution (episode 314, "Fighting Fred")
use of firearms (episode 405, "Time And Tide")
‘poofter bashing’ (episode 411, "A Crime Against Nature")
youth gangs (episode 434, "The Graduation Of Tony Walker")
child abuse (episode 463, "The Life And Times Of Tina Kennedy")
the dangers of hitch-hiking (episode 478, "Wipe Out")

Many early episodes were introduced by Fegan speaking directly to camera, to highlight their significance and, presumably, to indicate they may not be suitable for younger viewers.

Scripts were frequently based on real murder cases, including:
Episode 211, "I, Mick O'Byrne", based on the recent case of Ronald Ryan, the last man hanged in Australia.
Episode 37, "Colour of Hate", based on the real-life murder of a young police constable. The victim's family later wrote a very appreciative letter to Crawfords in which they described the episode as ‘a fine tribute to our son’s courage and devotion to duty’. The letter was later read out by Teale in the documentary The Homicide Story, who noted that it held a special place in the production team's files.
Episode 39, "A Lonely Place", based on the case of serial killer Arnold Sodeman, who strangled four girls between 1930 and 1935 when affected by alcohol. While Sodeman was hanged after a long legal battle, the episode doesn't indicate what happens to his fictional equivalent.
Episode 180, "Dead or Alive", based on real-life New Zealand mass killer Stanley Graham, who murdered seven people (four policemen and three civilians) in October 1941. Unlike the real case, where Graham was eventually shot dead by police, the fictional killer is captured alive, and the episode ends with detectives wondering if he will be sentenced to death or found insane.

Broadcast history 
The first episode aired on 20 October 1964. The debut episode ("The Stunt") was not the first to be produced, with the pilot ("One Man Crime Wave") airing as episode 24A just prior to the departure of Lex Mitchell.

Regular daytime repeat screenings began in the early 1970s running until the early 1980s, as strip programming. Additionally, seven episodes were screened as specials, or part of specials:

  ep. 376 – "Initiation", as part of the HSV-7 nostalgia program "Those Were The Days"
  episodes 379 ("The Last Way Out"), 385 ("The Friendly Fellow"), 394 ("Patterns & Stripes Don't Mix"), 410 ("Bill"), and 463 ("The Life & Times Of Tina Kennedy") as part of the program's 30th anniversary celebration in 1994
  ep. 383 – Assassin, shown in November 2005 as part of HSV-7's 50th year celebrations.

In the 1960s, the series was picked up, on a regional basis, by some of the ITV companies in the UK. Not all regions screened the show, which was scheduled in a late-night slot (usually 10:30pm or later), but among those that did were Westward TV, Yorkshire TV, Channel TV, Border TV and Southern Television.

In 2004, the episodes "Flashpoint" (ep. 56) and "Stopover" (ep. 504) were screened cinematically by Melbourne Cinematheque. In August 2010, WIN Television, as part of their late night "Crawford's Classic Drama" series, began sequential repeats from episode 1, but ceased in March 2011 at episode 33 (the pilot "One Man Crime Wave" was not included). The pilot is significant in that one of the actors in the show was Rona Newton-John, elder sister of Olivia Newton-John.

Technical specifications
Early episodes were in black and white with the bulk of material recorded on videotape in the studios of HSV7 using a multicamera setup. Each episode also featured about ten minutes of location footage shot on 16 mm film. Total time per episode was 47 minutes. 134 of the episodes were filmed in colour.

The opening and closing theme music was the library piece "Victory" written by American composer James Reichert.

With occasional exceptions, the filmed segments - which often focused on dramatic shots of cars pulling in, gun battles, and fist fights - did not have synchronised sound. Dialogue for these scenes was recorded "post sync". This means that the dialogue was recorded on location but, due to the often low quality of audio recorded in this manner, the actor was required to record the dialogue in a sound-proof studio in the standard filmmaking process known as Additional Dialogue Recording. Location recordings were used infrequently, and usually limited to brief dialogue snatches in enclosed spaces, such as the interior of a car. Sound effects would be also dubbed onto the location-shot footage. Both pre-recorded sound effects recordings and the work of Crawford's foley artist would be used.

Episode 56, "Flashpoint", which first aired on 19 April 1966, was shot entirely on location on film, and most of the dialogue of this episode was post-synched. Over the years the ratio of film to videotape was increased, and synchronised sound became the norm. When the series switched from black and white to colour in 1973, it necessitated shooting entirely on film, as the HSV7 studios were yet to be converted to colour video production.

If a script was amended, a Crawford Productions staff member who lived near the actor concerned would be required to deliver the new script to their house. Quite often this new dialogue had to be memorised for filming the next day.

The workload for the regular actors, especially for location work, was notoriously heavy. In 1967 the regular squad was increased from three to four to better share the load, which remained the standard team to the end.  In 1972, when it was decided to transfer production entirely to film, the result was a massive increase in overtime demanded by the series. Teale and Kurts promptly quit, and Mallaby only re-signed with a 13-week "escape clause", which he eventually invoked. All cited the worsening workload, which was best expressed by Teale as he announced his departure from the show:
"There has never been a dispute over basic pay rates; the dispute has always involved the massive overtime that Crawfords want me to work in the new year. In the end it became a simple choice between my marriage and Homicide. I chose my marriage."

Feature film
Late in the show's run – between episodes 470 and 480 – a feature-length episode was filmed. This film was entitled Stopover, with the title Homicide not used at all, and was shot entirely on film on new sets and on location at Melbourne Airport. Lawson, White, Deegan and Redford are the detectives in the film. The story involved an international rock band that was held at the airport following the fatal overdose of a band member. Guest stars included Jon English as the band's lead singer, and Tony Bonner as the band member who overdosed. The film never received a cinema release but was shown on television as a special in 1976. It is officially listed as episode 504, with episodes 502 and 503 also being feature-length.

Awards
Homicide won multiple awards for its scripts, including three AWGIEs, two Logies, one Penguin and one Sammy Award:

AWGIEs:
1970: John Dingwall – Best Script for a TV Drama Series for episode 208, "Everyone Knows Charlie"
1975: Peter Schreck – episode 434, "The Graduation Of Tony Walker"
1976: Keith Thompson – Best Script for Telemovie for episode 504, "Stopover"

Logies:
1973: Fred 'Cul' Cullen – Best Script for episode 385, "The Friendly Fellow"
1974: Fred 'Cul' Cullen – Best Script for episode 414, "Twelve Bar Blues"

Penguin:
1975: Australian Film Commission Second Prize for episode 434, "The Graduation Of Tony Walker"

Sammy:
1976: Keith Thompson – Best Writer (TV Play) for episode 504, "Stopover"

Significance
Homicide was the first major dramatic television series to be produced in Australia, the domestic television market having been previously dominated by American and British imports. In 1964, any Australian-made product tended to be quiz shows, children's series, music/variety series and one-off plays, with local drama production sporadic at best, with only a handful of typically short-lived series on commercial television such as Autumn Affair, Emergency and The Story of Peter Grey, along with several mini-series on ABC such as Stormy Petrel. Foreign imports were preferred because they were both cheaper and (especially for US series) more plentiful than local productions. Homicide proved that there was a market for home-grown dramatic programming and was highly successful from the start – its initial ratings were in the 30s, and regularly rated in the high 40s and even low 50s (modern cop show ratings tend to be in the 20s at best). In addition, the series was produced at a tenth of the cost of an overseas program and easily outrated them. In 1971, it was the top rated show in the country. Another Crawfords police drama, Division 4, was second.

The series also proved itself to be a virtual training ground for Australian television and film production. During its 12-year run, almost everyone in the industry – actors, directors, scriptwriters, producers, camera crew, etc. – worked on the series at some point in their careers, and guest roles were filled by many notable actors, both established and emerging. For these reasons, as well as for inspiring a series of popular cop dramas that followed, it remains one of the most important programmes in the history of Australian television.

In 1994, a special tribute to the  series aired titled Homicide: 30 Years On, hosted by Blue Heelers stars John Wood and Lisa McCune, which included interviews with surviving cast members and guest stars (both Fegan and Teale had already died at that time). In 2007, Homicide was chosen for an Australia Post stamp to celebrate 50 years of television in Australia.

DVD release
Homicide has been released on DVD in a series of box sets since December 2012. Each box set contains 26 episodes on 7 discs. Twenty box sets and a bonus disc of The Homicide Story have been released, representing the complete series run.

See also
 City Homicide
 List of longest-running Australian television series

References

External links

Seven Network original programming
1960s Australian drama television series
Television shows set in Melbourne
1964 Australian television series debuts
1977 Australian television series endings
1960s Australian crime television series
1970s Australian crime television series
Black-and-white Australian television shows
English-language television shows
Television series by Crawford Productions
1970s Australian drama television series